William Waterman (fl. 1414) was an English politician.

Waterman was a Member of the Parliament of England for Guildford in November 1414. Beyond this, nothing is recorded of him.

References 

English MPs November 1414
Members of Parliament for Guildford
14th-century births
15th-century deaths